Clube de Futebol Os Balantas is a Guinea-Bissauan football club based in Mansôa. They play in the top division in Guinean football, the Campeonato Nacional da Guiné-Bissau.  The club is named after the Balanta people (or Southern Balanta), the club location where the people inhabit.  Mansoa is the main city of the Balantas in Guinea-Bissau.  It is being the most popular club of the Oio Region.

History

Earlier club
The earlier Os Balanta was created on 16 September 1946 and is an affiliate of the Portuguese club CF Os Belenenses and is its 13th affiliate.

They played their first match in the 1960 Portuguese Guinea Provincial Championships and played until 1974, the club won all championship titles (from 1973, also as the Guinea-Bissau Championships).

The club took part in the upper rounds of the Portuguese Cup before independence, they participated in five matches including Lusitano de Évora, SC Braga, Fabril, Académica de Coimbra and Beja.  They had three colonial titles for what was Portuguese Guinea.

Modern club
The club was founded in 1974 in Mansôa, the year that the country became independent.  It is the first club founded in Mansoa. The team was the first Guinean champion after the independence from Portugal and played in the preliminary round of the African Cup of Champions Clubs 1976, their first team they faced was Senegal's ASC Diaraf and lost all two matches. Their next appearances was 31 years later at the CAF Champions League 2007 and faced Algeria's JS Kabylie and again lost all two matches.  Os Balantas nearly played in every continental competition after winning their championship title in 2010, next was Morocco's Difaa El Jadida. They missed the 2014 competition against Séwé Sports as Balantas withdrew.  Balantas are one of several clubs that never made a win at the continental championships.  They also won their only super cup title in 2006 after winning their second championship title.

In 2010, they headed to the Guinea-Bissauan Cup final, the club lost 2–1 to Sport Bissau e Benfica.

Logo
Its logo is blue and features the acronym CFB.

Achievements 
Campeonato Nacional da Guiné-Bissau: 4
1975, 2006, 2009, 2013

SuperTaça Nacional da Guiné-Bissau: 1
2006

League and cup history

Performance in CAF competitions 
CAF Champions League: 2 appearances
2007 – Preliminary Round

1Balantas withdrew from the tournament

National level

Statistics
Best position: First Round (continental)
Best position at cup competitions: Finalist (national)
Total goals scored at the continental championship competitions: 4
Total matches played at the CAF Champions League: 6
Total matches played at home: 3
Total matches played away: 3
Total number of goals scored at the CAF Champions League: 4

Managers
 Bacri Sanha (until 2014)
 Soo (in 2015)
 Idrrissa Mwhinni (current)

References

External links
Team profile – mondedufoot.fr
CF Os Balantas at the Final Ball

Campeonato Nacional da Guiné-Bissau clubs
Balantas
1974 establishments in Guinea-Bissau
Oio Region